Leeward Islands is the northern islands of the Lesser Antilles.

Leeward Islands may also refer to:

 Leeward Islands (Society Islands), the western islands of the Society Islands in French Polynesia
 Pulau Bawah, old colonial name for the group of six Indonesian islands was Leeward Islands
 Sotavento Islands ("Sotavento" means "Leeward"), the southern island group of Cape Verde archipelago
 Northwestern Hawaiian Islands, sometimes called the "Leeward Islands"
 British Leeward Islands, a former British colony in the Lesser Antilles
 45614 Leeward Islands, a British LMS Jubilee Class locomotive

See also 
 Leeward Antilles, the southernmost islands of the Lesser Antilles
 Leeward (disambiguation)
 Windward Islands (disambiguation)